Dilibe Pius Onyedikachi popularly known by his stage name Hyper p is a Nigerian blogger, developer and musician. He is the founder of Hypexclusive Entertainment Media, an entertainment, news, music and music promotion platform in Nigeria, reaching out to Africa and the world at large.

Biography 
Hyper p was born and raised in the Northern part of Nigeria, Nasarawa state, he developed interest in music when he was seven years old due to that, he participated in the children music group and choir groups in his church. As a kid raised by godly parents, he started as a gospel artist and wrote many songs at his tender age.
In 2019, hyper p started officially his music career with the release of Tell Mama, followed by Better Days, Calm Down and earlier in 2020 he dropped Ego Ndia before he had a break due to finance.
Later in the year, he started a blog helping upcoming artists blog and hype their songs.

References